The Young Millionaire is a 1912 short silent film drama. The film starred Earle Foxe and Alice Joyce who were acting together in their third film that year, having already starred in The Street Singer and The County Fair. It was the third film of Earle Foxe, aged seventeen.

Cast
Tom Moore as John Harris
Alice Joyce as Anna Newton
Earle Foxe		
Hazel Neason as Sarah Curtis	
Stuart Holmes

External links

1912 films
American silent short films
1912 romantic drama films
American black-and-white films
Kalem Company films
American romantic drama films
1912 short films
1910s American films
Silent romantic drama films
Silent American drama films
1910s English-language films
American drama short films